The Diables Barcelona are a professional rugby franchise from the city of Barcelona that was born in 2021 to compete in an international franchise league. The Diables made their first appearance in November 2021 to play in the Toyota Challenge tournament at the Free State Stadium in Bloemfontein, South Africa.

The franchise aspires to participate in a new international competition that is being created and already has a place guaranteed. This new competition will mainly involve teams from southern Africa and Europe. Some of the franchises have already announced their willingness to participate, such as the Cheetahs or Kuva Blue thunder  of Zimbabwe.

References

Spanish rugby league teams